The 1988 Player's International Canadian Open was a tennis tournament played on outdoor hard courts. The men's tournament was held at the National Tennis Centre in Toronto in Canada and was part of the 1988 Nabisco Grand Prix while the women's tournament was held at the du Maurier Stadium in Montreal in Canada and was part of Tier II of the 1988 WTA Tour. The men's tournament was held from August 8 through August 14, 1988, while the women's tournament was held from August 15 through August 21, 1988.

Finals

Men's singles

 Ivan Lendl defeated  Kevin Curren 7–6, 6–2
 It was Lendl's 3rd title of the year and the 79th of his career.

Women's singles

 Gabriela Sabatini defeated  Natasha Zvereva 6–1, 6–2
 It was Sabatini's 5th title of the year and the 17th of her career.

Men's doubles
 Ken Flach /  Robert Seguso defeated  Andrew Castle /  Tim Wilkison 7–6(7–3), 6–3
 It was Flach's 3rd title of the year and the 22nd of his career. It was Seguso's 3rd title of the year and the 22nd of his career.

Women's doubles

 Jana Novotná /  Helena Suková defeated  Zina Garrison /  Pam Shriver 7–6, 7–6
 It was Novotná's 5th title of the year and the 9th of her career. It was Suková's 3rd title of the year and the 31st of her career.

References

External links
 
 Association of Tennis Professionals (ATP) tournament profile
 Women's Tennis Association (WTA) tournament profile

Player's Canadian Open
Player's Canadian Open
Player's Canadian Open
Player's Canadian Open
Canadian Open (tennis)